Michele Canini (born 5 June 1985) is an Italian footballer who plays as a defender.

Club career

Cagliari & early career
After a loan spell in Serie C1 team Sambenedettese, his first club Atalanta sold him to Cagliari Calcio in co-ownership deal, for €570,000 (with Simone Loria moved to Atalanta for an undisclosed fee). He earned a permanent move to Cagliari in June 2006, for an additional €1.5 million, and spent a seven-year spell playing 176 league matches for the team until the 2011–12 season.

Genoa
On 12 July 2012, Canini joined Genoa on a four-year deal for €2.9 million.

Atalanta return
He returned to former club Atalanta on 9 January 2013 for €1 million in a co-ownership deal on a -year contract, as part of Thomas Manfredini's deal for €1.25 million. In June 2013, Canini's co-ownership was renewed.

Chievo (loan)
On 27 January 2014, he was signed by Chievo in a temporary deal. In June 2014, Atalanta acquired Canini outright from Genoa.

FC Tokyo (loan)
On 27 July 2014, he was signed by J1 League side FC Tokyo in a temporary deal. Canini left Japan on 24 June 2015.

Ascoli (loan)
On 18 September 2015, Canini was signed by Ascoli.

Parma (loan)
On 12 August 2016, Canini was signed by Lega Pro newcomers Parma on another temporary deal.

Cremonese (loan)
On 31 January 2017, Canini left for Cremonese on a temporary deal for  seasons.

FeralpiSalò
On 20 July 2018 Canini was signed by FeralpiSalò on a 1-year contract.

Pergolettese
On 12 August 2019 he joined Pergolettese on a 1-year contract. He was released from his contract with Pergolettese for personal reasons on 12 December 2019.

International career
Canini played for Italy at youth level in the 2005 FIFA World Youth Championship, and in the 2006 and 2007 UEFA European Under-21 Football Championships.

References

External links
cagliaricalcio.net 
FIGC 

1985 births
Living people
Footballers from Brescia
Italian footballers
Atalanta B.C. players
Cagliari Calcio players
Genoa C.F.C. players
A.S. Sambenedettese players
A.C. ChievoVerona players
FC Tokyo players
Ascoli Calcio 1898 F.C. players
Parma Calcio 1913 players
U.S. Cremonese players
FeralpiSalò players
U.S. Pergolettese 1932 players
Serie A players
Serie B players
Serie C players
J1 League players
Association football defenders
Italy under-21 international footballers
Italy youth international footballers
Italian expatriate footballers
Expatriate footballers in Japan